Israel–Tunisia relations refers to bilateral relations between Israel and Tunisia. There are no official diplomatic relations between the two states.

Country comparison

History
The earliest contacts between Israel and Tunisia took place at the United Nations in New York in 1951–1952, when Tunisian representatives approached the Israeli delegation and Israeli labor leaders. In June 1952, Bahi Ladgham, a close confidant of Habib Bourguiba, met with Gideon Rafael seeking support for Tunisian independence. Bourguiba stated that he would not seek Israel's elimination and would work to promote peace in the region. In 1956, after Tunisia declared independence, he met secretly with Ya'akov Tzur, Israel's ambassador to France. Later that year, Tsur met with the Tunisian finance minister, who sought Israel's assistance in building cooperative agricultural settlements.

Operation Wooden Leg was an attack by Israel on the Palestine Liberation Organization (PLO) headquarters in Hammam al-Shatt, Tunisia, 12 miles from the capital of Tunis. It took place on October 1, 1985. Casualties 47-71 dead, around 15 of them were Tunisian civilians who were killed and about 100 wounded.

Tunisia claims it played a major role in secret talks between the PLO and Israel which led to the Declaration of Principles on Palestinian Self-Rule, signed in September 1993. Soon after, an Israeli delegation visited Tunisia for talks. Salah Masawi, director general of the Tunisian Ministry of Foreign Affairs, stated that he saw no obstacle to establishing diplomatic relations with Israel. In 1993, Yossi Beilin, then Israel's Deputy Minister for Foreign Affairs, visited Tunisia. Direct telephone links were established in July 1993. After the Tunisia offices of the PLO were closed in June 1994, the first Israeli tourists arrived.

In 1994, channels of communication were opened with Israel through the Belgian embassies in Tel Aviv and Tunis. Tunisian Foreign Minister Habib Ben Yahia and then-Israeli Foreign Minister Ehud Barak met in Barcelona in 1995 to expand official relations between the two countries after relations had been confined to "two communications channels" in the Belgian embassies in each of Tunis and Tel Aviv. On Jan. 22, 1996, then US Secretary of State Warren Christopher announced "that for the first time Israel and Tunisia will establish official facilities called "interests sections" in each other's countries. By April 15 of this year, each nation will host representatives of the other government so as to facilitate political consultations, travel, and trade between their two countries". According to plan, Israel opened an interest office in Tunisia in April and six weeks later, in May, Tunisian diplomat Khemaies Jhinaoui went to Israel to open his country's interest office in Tel Aviv.

Relations worsened in the early 2000s after the start of the Second Intifada. On October 22, 2000, President Ben Ali announced that he would break all diplomatic ties with Israel following the "violence in the Palestinian-controlled territories". Israel expressed its disappointment at the Tunisian decision to sever relations and close the interest offices in Tel Aviv and Tunis. The Israeli Foreign Ministry said: "It appears that Tunisia has elected to renounce its potential role as a bridge for dialogue between Israel and its neighbours, thereby harming the critical effort to promote regional peace."

In June 2021, both Israel and Tunisia were among 30 countries which participated in the Sea Breeze 2021, multinational naval maneuvers in the Black Sea.

Sporting events
In 2020, Tunisian President Kais Saied called for an investigation, following the participation of Israeli tennis player, Aaron Cohen, in the ITF World Tennis Tour Juniors in Tunisia, where he also played against Tunisian player, Karim Chedly. However, there were previously other encounters between Israeli and Tunisian tennis players, such as the match between Malek Jaziri and Dudi Sela in 2016.

Later on, the national women's tennis teams met at the 2020 Fed Cup in Helsinki. Moreover, Tunisian Aziz Dougaz competed against Israeli Dudi Sela at the 2020 Morelos Open.

See also
 History of the Jews in Tunisia
 Judeo-Tunisian Arabic
 Ghriba synagogue bombing
 Operation Wooden Leg

References

 
Tunisia
Bilateral relations of Tunisia